Pyrroline-5-carboxylate reductase family, member 2 is a protein that in humans is encoded by the PYCR2 gene.

Function 

This gene belongs to the pyrroline-5-carboxylate reductase family. The encoded mitochondrial protein catalyzes the conversion of pyrroline-5-carboxylate to proline, which is the last step in proline biosynthesis. Loss of PYCR2 does not lead to a gross defect in mitochondrial protein synthesis, but loss of function of PYCR2 leads to increased apoptosis under oxidative stress.

Clinical significance
Mutations in the PYCR2 gene have been identified as the cause of a unique syndrome characterized by postnatal microcephaly, hypomyelination, and reduced cerebral white-matter volume. Hypomyelination and the absence of wrinkly skin makes this condition distinct from that caused by previously reported mutations in the gene encoding PYCR2’s isozyme, PYCR1, suggesting a unique and indispensable role for PYCR2 in the human CNS during development. This is substantiated by the fact that PYCR2 mRNA is moderately expressed in the developing human brain, and in much higher forms than either of the other two isoforms. Although PYCR2 is an enzyme for proline biosynthesis, systemic deprivation of proline does not appear to be the pathogenetic mechanism of this condition, given that plasma amino acid analysis in two affected individuals did not show low proline levels. Furthermore, mitochondrial protein synthesis was not affected in PYCR2-deficient cells. Therefore, deficiency of proline, as a building block of proteins, might not be the major pathophysiology. However, proline has been reported as a non-enzymatic antioxidant that suppresses apoptosis, and therefore local proline biosynthesis in neurons might be important for neuronal protection against oxidative stress.

The PYCR family also has been correlated with melanoma cells. PYCR2 as well as PYCR are abundant in melanoma cells but not detected in melanocytes.

References

Further reading